The Psychology Club Zürich (German: Psychologischer Club Zürich) is an association founded in Küsnacht, Switzerland, in 1916 by Swiss psychiatrist and psychologist Carl Jung, with former patients and students, to promote and develop analytical psychology. Located in a neo-Gothic building at Gemeindestrasse 27, Zürich, it became a prototype for other psychology clubs.

The club continues to play an important role in the global development of Jungian psychology. Its centenary was celebrated in 2016.

See also 
 C. G. Jung Institute, Zürich

References

External links 

 Club website (in English and German)

Carl Jung
Institute
Küsnacht
Psychology institutes
Psychology organisations based in Switzerland